Nika Agiashvili (born October 20, 1979) is a Georgian-American writer and director. In 2009, Nika wrote, produced and directed his first feature film, The Harsh Life of Veronica Lambert. His next project, 'A Green Story' starred Ed O'Ross, George Finn, Billy Zane, Annabella Sciorra, Shannon Elizabeth and Malcolm McDowell. A Green Story was theatrically released worldwide in 2013. In 2014, Nika wrote, directed and produced Tbilisi, I Love You as part of Emmanuel Benbihy's 'Cities of Love' franchise that started with Paris, je t'aime and New York, I Love You. In 2018, Agiashvili wrote and executive produced Daughter of the Wolf starring two time Academy Award Winner Richard Dreyfuss, Gina Carano and Brendan Fehr. The film was released worldwide in 2019 and received three Canadian Screen Award nominations at the 8th Canadian Screen Awards in 2020, for Best TV Movie, Best Supporting Actor in a Television Drama Series or Program (Fehr) and Best Direction in a Television Drama Series or Program (Hackl).

Filmography
 The Harsh Life of Veronica Lambert (2009) (Feature Film) (Writer) (Director)
 A Green Story (2012) (Feature Film) (Writer) (Director)
 MR.M (2014) (Short Film) (Writer) (Director)
 Tbilisi, I Love You (2014) (Writer) (Director)
 Daughter of the Wolf (2019) (Writer) (Executive Producer)

References 

1979 births
Living people
Georgian emigrants to the United States
Film people from Tbilisi
American film directors
Film directors from Georgia (country)

External links